Marta Linden (born Marta Leffler; October 24, 1903 - December 13, 1990) was an American actress. She was best known for appearing in Mickey Rooney's film A Yank at Eton (1942).

Early life
Linden was born Marta Leffler on October 24, 1903, in New York City, and she was the daughter of Swedish parents. In the 1920s, she married businessman Alfred Schmid, whose fortune disappeared in the Great Depression. 

After her husband lost his fortune, Linden found a job working at a candy counter. Eventually she decided that opportunity awaited in Hollywood, so the family moved there. Her acting at the Pasadena Community Playhouse developed into playing female leads. That exposure, in turn, led to interest from film executives.

Career

Film career

In 1942, Linden signed a long-term contract with Metro-Goldwyn-Mayer. Films in which she appeared include The Youngest Profession (1943), A Yank at Eton (1942), Maisie Goes to Reno (1944), and Stand By for Action (1942).

Broadway
Linden's Broadway credits include The Starcross Story (1954), The Curious Savage (1950), Cry of the Peacock (1950), The Men We Marry (1948), and Present Laughter (1946). She also acted in the touring version of Present Laughter.

Later years
In 1954, Linden appeared in the soap opera Woman with a Past on CBS-TV.

Death
On December 13, 1990, Linden died of pneumonia at Lenox Hill Hospital at age 87.

References

External links 

 
 

1903 births
1990 deaths
20th-century American actresses
American film actresses
American stage actresses
American television actresses
Actresses from New York (state)